José Silvano Ángelo  (born 20 May 1980 in Palma, Majorca, Balearic Islands) is a Spanish footballer who plays as a defensive midfielder.

Silvano played almost his entire career in the lower leagues, and almost exclusively in his native region of the Balearic Islands or the neighbouring Canary Islands. In the 2002–03 season he appeared in one Segunda División match, with UD Las Palmas, away against Albacete Balompié (1–2 loss, 90 minutes played).

References

External links

1980 births
Living people
Footballers from Palma de Mallorca
Spanish footballers
Association football midfielders
Segunda División players
Segunda División B players
RCD Mallorca B players
CE Constància players
UD Las Palmas Atlético players
UD Las Palmas players
UD Vecindario players
CD Guijuelo footballers
CD Mensajero players
Spain youth international footballers